Christos Kontis (born 13 May 1975) is a Greek professional football manager and former player.

Club career
Kontis started his career at Ethnikos Piraeus. In Greece he played also for Panionios, Olympiacos and AEK Athens. With Olympiacos he won 3 Greek Championships.

In the summer of 2006 he moved to Cyprus and signed with APOEL. During his five-year spell with APOEL, he won 3 Championships, 1 Cup and 3 Super Cups. He also appeared in four official 2009–10 UEFA Champions League group stage matches with APOEL.

End of career
After a successful career at APOEL, Christos Kontis was forced to retire due to heart failure problems. During the first official 2011–12 Cypriot First Division match (29 August 2011) between AEK Larnaca and APOEL, Kontis felt a slight discomfort and a pain in his chest. Later that night the discomfort continued to exist and the pain got worse, thus the club's doctors moved him to Nicosia's General Hospital. It was diagnosed that Kontis had suffered a minor heart attack that had damaged one of the veins in his heart. Consequently, he was forced to retire from his professional football career 9 months before his contract with APOEL expires.

He was one of APOEL's fans' favorite players and he will always be remembered for his passion and for the low profile that he always kept. These virtues earned him the respect and admiration of all Cypriot football fans. He wore the jersey with the number 24.

Managerial career
When Christos Kontis recovered fully from the heart incident that forced him to retire, the Board of Directors of APOEL appointed him as an assistant of the head coach of APOEL, Ivan Jovanović. He served as an assistant manager of Ivan Jovanović at APOEL for two years, until the end of 2012–13 season.

Christos Kontis has served as an assistant manager of the head coach of Al-Nasr, Ivan Jovanović from 2013 to 2016. He was subsequently hired by Olympiacos for the same role, and served as the team's caretaker manager for a fixture against Larisa on 7 January 2018, while the transition from Takis Lemonis to the club's new manager Óscar García took place; he also coached the team in a Greek Cup quarter-final return leg game against rivals AEK on 7 February 2018 as García was hospitalised with an appendicitis inflammation.
He also finished season as a head coach for the last month of the campaign 2017–18.

On the summer of 2019, Christos took his first full managerial job at Hatta with the job of keeping the promoted club in the top flight of UAE football. However on November of 2020, he was sacked due to lack of victories, during the cancelled 19–20 season, Hatta was at the relegation zone and in the first six matches of the following 20–21 season, Hatta was at the bottom of the league with 1 point.

Managerial statistics

Honours
Olympiacos
 Greek Super League: 2000–01, 2001–02, 2002–03

APOEL
 Cypriot First Division: 2006–07, 2008–09, 2010–11
 Cypriot Cup: 2007–08
 Cypriot Super Cup: 2008, 2009, 2011

References

External links

Living people
1975 births
Ethnikos Piraeus F.C. players
AEK Athens F.C. players
APOEL FC players
Panionios F.C. players
Olympiacos F.C. players
Super League Greece players
Cypriot First Division players
Association football defenders
Hatta Club managers
Greek football managers
UAE Pro League managers
Expatriate football managers in the United Arab Emirates
Footballers from Athens
Greek footballers
Greek expatriate sportspeople in the United Arab Emirates